"No Ties" is a song by South African R&B singer Tshego, released as the only single from his first studio album Pink Panther. The song was produced by South African record producer Alie Keys, and Tshego. It was ranked at number 12 on OkayAfrica's list of 20 Best South African Songs of 2019. An amapiano remix with an additional feature from South African amapiano musical duo MFR Souls, released on 7 February 2020. The song received a nomination at the 26th South African Music Awards for Record of the Year in 2020.

Background
Following his exit from Family Tree in 2018, after winning a court case against the label owner Cassper Nyovest. He got back full ownership of all his masters; released under the label, and took them off stores. His imprint Twenty Five Eight Entertainment; signed a licensing deal with Universal Music Africa; before the release of "No Ties", from the Pink Panther project; through Universal Music.

Music video

The music video was released on 9 October 2019. As of December 2021, the music video has 2.1 million views on YouTube.

Commercial performance
On 23 December 2019, "No Ties" peaked at number nine on Apple Music Top 100 R&B/Soul Songs in South Africa. On 20 October 2019, it debuted at number three on South Africa iTunes Radio Top 100 R&B/Soul Songs. "No Ties" is Tshego's most popular record with over 1.6 million streams on Spotify as of December 2021. OkayAfrica included the song in their list of 50 Best Songs Of 2019.

Accolades

Credits and personnel
Credits adapted from Genius.
 Tshego – vocals, songwriting, producer
 King Monada – vocals, songwriting
 MFR Souls 
 Tumelo Nedondwe – vocals, songwriting (remix only)
 Tumelo Mabe – vocals, songwriting (remix only)
 Alie Keys - production

Certifications

Release history

References 

2019 singles
2019 songs
South African pop songs
Rhythm and blues songs
Soul songs
2020 singles